Nicolás Salzillo  (born Nicola Salzillo; Santa Maria Capua Vetere, July 13, 1672 - Murcia, October 6, 1727) was an Italian sculptor who from 1699, aged 27, was active in Murcia, Spain. He worked mostly in life-size painted wooden religious sculpture. His son, Francisco Salzillo, was an even more prominent baroque wood sculptor. He was born in Santa Maria Capua Vetere, Italy and died in Murcia.

References

1622 births
1727 deaths
People from Murcia
Spanish male sculptors
Spanish Baroque sculptors
Spanish people of Italian descent
Italian Baroque sculptors